The Town, now known as Robbins, NC actually began in 1795 when gunsmith Alexander Kennedy and his family left Philadelphia to settle along Bear Creek. Kennedy set up a factory, which produced long rifles for American soldiers, near the site of the present day Robbins Water Plant. The Kennedy rifle works continued in operation until 1838 and the place became known as Mechanics Hill.

Kennedy also established what was reputed to have been "the largest gun factory in this part of the south" in which he worked as many as seventy-five hands.

According to tradition, Kennedy bought part interest in a small gun shop owned and operated by William Williamson after which they ran the concern jointly as Williamson and Kennedy. A few old guns in the section bear the initials "W. W. and D. K." Later, Kennedy bought out sole interest in the business.

Various types of guns and swords were made in this factory. The finer rifles were said to have been ornamented with silver melted from sixteen silver dollars and sold for proportionately higher prices. Large grindstones, which were operated by water power, shaped the barrels into octagonal shape and the metal was drawn out and molded by large trip hammers, also operated by water power. Finally, the task of truing the sights on the rifles was accomplished by shooting across the millpond to a target on the other side, near which stood a man to mark the deviation from the bull’s eye. The sights were then patiently varied until they were found true. Many of these guns are said to have been used in the War of 1812. So important did this business become that a post office was established there and names Mechanics Hill.

There is a local legend to the effect that Kennedy, weary of paying such a high price for his gunlocks which he "imported" from a New York factory, made a trip on horseback to the latter factory, where he found that the secret method used in making the locks was carefully guarded. Undaunted, he finally wormed his way into the good graces of the workers and operators by his violin music, which they greatly admired. Once inside the shop, he soon discovered the secret involved and returned to Mechanics Hill where he began to make his own.

A contemporary writer described the business in 1810:

We have no manufactories unless the efforts of a couple of Riffle Makers deserve that name – these Men are Self Taught and believed to excel any Gun Smiths in the State for Neteness and Elegence of Work, The Profits of David Kennedy is worth about $15,00 [$15,000?] and that of his Brother about $1000 P. Annum.

Little else is known of the sylvan operator other than the fact that he is said to have given the land and borne the expense for the construction of the old Mechanics Hill Baptist Church, the first Baptist Church in that section of Moore County. Described as "a substantial frame building 40 x 60 ft." The building is still standing at Flint Hill between Carthage and Robbins. Inside one may still see the narrow, uncomfortable wooden seats, typical of earlier days. Planked wood railings divided the pews from each other.

The Durham and Charlotte Railroad reached Mechanics Hill in 1899.

References 

Towns in North Carolina